The 1922 Toronto Argonauts season was the 36th season for the team since the franchise's inception in 1873. The team finished in first place in the Interprovincial Rugby Football Union for the third consecutive season with a 5–0–1 record and defeated Toronto Parkdale Canoe Club in the East Semi-Final game. However, they lost to Queen's University in the East Final by a score of 12–11 and failed to defend their Grey Cup title.

Regular season

Standings

Schedule
The Argonauts' home game on September 30 versus Montreal was played at Toronto Athletic Field at Scarboro Beach Park, owing to a scheduling clash with the University of Toronto, who played at Varsity Stadium that afternoon.

Postseason

References

Toronto Argonauts seasons